César Chávez is a census-designated place (CDP) in Hidalgo County, Texas. The population was 1,929 at the 2010 United States Census. It is part of the McAllen–Edinburg–Mission Metropolitan Statistical Area.

Geography
César Chávez is located at  (26.302748, -98.109332).

Demographics
As of the census of 2000, there were 1,469 people, 445 households, and 372 families residing in the CDP. The population density was 457.6 people per square mile (176.7/km2). There were 793 housing units at an average density of 247.0/sq mi (95.4/km2). The racial makeup of the CDP was 77.67% White, 0.07% Native American, 20.15% from other races, and 2.11% from two or more races. Hispanic or Latino of any race were 81.55% of the population.

There were 445 households, out of which 41.3% had children under the age of 18 living with them, 66.5% were married couples living together, 12.8% had a female householder with no husband present, and 16.4% were non-families. 14.4% of all households were made up of individuals, and 9.9% had someone living alone who was 65 years of age or older. The average household size was 3.30 and the average family size was about 3.654.

In the CDP, the population was spread out, with 33.2% under the age of 18, 9.1% from 18 to 24, 23.6% from 25 to 44, 16.3% from 45 to 64, and 17.9% who were 65 years of age or older. The median age was 32 years. For every 100 females, there were 91.8 males. For every 100 females age 18 and over, there were 87.8 males.

The median income for a household in the CDP was $20,491, and the median income for a family was $23,088. Males had a median income of $19,063 versus $25,789 for females. The per capita income for the CDP was $9,432. About 26.9% of families and 31.5% of the population were below the poverty line, including 56.8% of those under age 18 and 10.2% of those age 65 or over.

Education
César Chávez is served by the Edinburg Consolidated Independent School District.

Zoned elementary campuses serving sections include Eisenhower, Gorena, Lyndon B. Johnson, and Lincoln (grades PK-5).

All residents are zoned to Memorial Middle School (6-8), and Economedes High School (9-12).

In addition, South Texas Independent School District operates magnet schools that serve the community.

All of Hidalgo County is in the service area of South Texas College.

References

Census-designated places in Hidalgo County, Texas
Census-designated places in Texas